Events in the year 1810 in Art.

Events
 Four members of the Vienna Lukasbund (Johann Friedrich Overbeck, Franz Pforr, Ludwig Vogel and Johann Konrad Hottinger) move to Rome where they occupy the abandoned monastery of San Isidoro and join with others to form the Nazarene movement.
 Dominique Vivant Denon assists the Hermitage Museum in the acquisition of Rosso Fiorentino's Madonna and Child with Cherubs in Paris.

Works
William Blake – A Vision of the Last Judgment (lost)
Jacques-Louis David – The Distribution of the Eagle Standards
Louis Ducis – Portrait of Napoléon Bonaparte with his Nephews and Nieces on the Terrace at Saint-Cloud
Caspar David Friedrich – The Abbey in the Oakwood
François Gérard
The Battle of Austerlitz
Portrait of Portrait of Camillo Borghrse
Portrait of Désirée Clary
Anne-Louis Girodet de Roussy-Trioson – The Revolt in Cairo, 21 October 1798
Francisco Goya – The Disasters of War (prints – series begins)
Alexander Nasmyth – Loch Katrine

Awards
 Grand Prix de Rome, painting:
 Grand Prix de Rome, sculpture:
 Grand Prix de Rome, architecture:

Births
January 15 – John Evan Thomas, Welsh sculptor (died 1873)
January 23 – John Rogers Herbert, English religious painter (died 1890)
May 26 – Christen Købke, Danish painter (died 1848)
May 28 – Alexandre Calame, Swiss painter (died 1864)
July 17 – Georg Heinrich Busse, German landscape painter and engraver (died 1868)
September 3 – Paul Kane, Irish-Canadian painter (died 1871)
September – William Edward Frost, English nude painter (died 1877)
October 11 – Anton Zwengauer, German painter (died 1884)

Deaths
January 6 – Charles-Antoine Clevenbergh, Flemish painter of still-life (born 1755)
January 23 
John Hoppner, portrait painter (born 1758)
Francesco Piranesi, Italian engraver and architect (born 1756/1758)
March 1 – Jean-Jacques de Boissieu, painter and etcher (born 1736)
March 9 – Ozias Humphrey, English painter of portrait miniatures (born 1742)
March 19 – Louis Masreliez, Swedish painter and interior designer (born 1748)
April 18 – Antoine-Denis Chaudet, French sculptor who worked in a neoclassical style (born 1763)
May – Richard Crosse, English painter of portrait miniatures (born 1742)
May 2 – Jean Guillaume Moitte, French sculptor (born 1746)
June 7 – Luigi Schiavonetti, Italian artist (born 1765)
August 28 – Henry Blundell, art collector (born 1724)
November 11 – Johann Zoffany – German neoclassical painter (born 1733)
November 30 – Stefano Tofanelli, Italian painter during the Neoclassic period (born 1750)
December 2 – Philipp Otto Runge, painter (born 1777)
 December 18 – John Inigo Richards, English landscape painter (born 1731)
date unknown
 Johan Alm, Finnish painter and field sergeant (born 1728)
 William Baillie, Irish engraver (born 1723)
 Christopher Barber, English miniature painter (born 1736)
 Jonas Bergman, Finnish painter (born 1724)
 John Boyne, British water-colour painter (born 1750)
 William Ellis, English engraver (born 1747)
 John Emes, British engraver and water-colour painter (born 1762)
 Charles Eschard, French painter, draftsman and engraver (born 1748)
 Vinzenz Fischer, Austrian historical painter and professor of architecture (born 1729)
 Charles Grignion the Elder, British engraver and draughtsman (born 1721)
 Luke Havell, English  engraver, etcher and painter (born 1752)
 Pietro la Vega, Italian archaeologist and artist (born unknown)

References

 
Years of the 19th century in art
1810s in art